The electoral district of Keysborough was an electoral district of the Victorian Legislative Assembly in Australia. It was created in the redistribution of electoral boundaries in 2013, and came into effect at the 2014 state election.

It largely covered the area of the former district of Lyndhurst, covering southeast suburbs of Melbourne. It included the suburbs of Springvale South, Noble Park, Keysborough, and Dingley Village.

The seat of Keysborough was only ever held by Labor MP Martin Pakula during its existence.

The seat was abolished by the Electoral Boundaries Commission ahead of the 2022 election and predominantly split into the electoral districts of Clarinda, Dandenong and Mordialloc.

Members

Election results

References

External links
 District profile from the Victorian Electoral Commission

Keysborough, Electoral district of
2014 establishments in Australia
2022 disestablishments in Australia